In Tibetan cuisine, Yurla is a wheat pastry with butter, particularly common in Nyainrong County in northern Tibet.

See also
 List of pastries
 List of Tibetan dishes

References

Tibetan pastries
Wheat dishes